Azimech may refer to:

 USS Azimech, a U.S. Navy cargo ship
 A historical name for the star Arcturus
 A historical name for the star Spica